Tom Armstrong (born 1950, Evansville, Indiana) is an American cartoonist and the creator of the daily newspaper comic strip Marvin, which he has written and drawn continuously since its creation in 1982.

He was also the original artist on Tom Batiuk's newspaper comic strip John Darling, which he drew from 1979 through 1985; he left the strip in 1985 to concentrate on Marvin, with Gerry Shamray replacing Armstrong on the John Darling strip.

He received the Elzie Segar Award in 1996. Armstrong graduated from the University of Evansville.

References

Strickler, Dave. Syndicated Comic Strips and Artists, 1924-1995: The Complete Index. Cambria, CA: Comics Access, 1995. .

External links
NCS Awards
Billy Ireland Cartoon Library & Museum Art Database

1950 births
American comic strip cartoonists
Artists from Indiana
Date of birth missing (living people)
Living people
People from Evansville, Indiana
University of Evansville alumni